Keloid, also known as keloid disorder and keloidal scar,
is the formation of a type of scar which, depending on its maturity, is composed mainly of either type III (early) or type I (late) collagen. It is a result of an overgrowth of granulation tissue (collagen type 3) at the site of a healed skin injury which is then slowly replaced by collagen type 1.  Keloids are firm, rubbery lesions or shiny, fibrous nodules, and can vary from pink to the color of the person's skin or red to dark brown in color. A keloid scar is benign and not contagious, but sometimes accompanied by severe itchiness, pain, and changes in texture. In severe cases, it can affect movement of skin. In the United States keloid scars are seen 15 times more frequently in people of sub-Saharan African descent than in people of European descent. There is a higher tendency to develop a keloid among those with a family history of keloids and people between the ages of 10 and 30 years.

Keloids should not be confused with hypertrophic scars, which are raised scars that do not grow beyond the boundaries of the original wound.

Signs and symptoms

Keloids expand in claw-like growths over normal skin. They have the capability to hurt with a needle-like pain or to itch, the degree of sensation varying from person to person.

Keloids form within scar tissue. Collagen, used in wound repair, tends to overgrow in this area, sometimes producing a lump many times larger than that of the original scar. They can also range in color from pink to red. Although they usually occur at the site of an injury, keloids can also arise spontaneously.  They can occur at the site of a piercing and even from something as simple as a pimple or scratch. They can occur as a result of severe acne or chickenpox scarring, infection at a wound site, repeated trauma to an area, excessive skin tension during wound closure or a foreign body in a wound. Keloids can sometimes be sensitive to chlorine. If a keloid appears when someone is still growing, the keloid can continue to grow as well.

Location
Keloids can develop in any place where skin trauma has occurred. They can be the result of pimples, insect bites, scratching, burns, or other skin injury. Keloid scars can develop after surgery.
They are more common in some sites, such as the central chest (from a sternotomy), the back and shoulders (usually resulting from acne), and the ear lobes (from ear piercings). They can also occur on body piercings.
The most common spots are earlobes, arms, pelvic region, and over the collar bone.

Cause
Most skin injury types can contribute to scarring. This includes burns, acne scars, chickenpox scars, ear piercing, scratches, surgical incisions, and vaccination sites.

According to the (US) National Center for Biotechnology Information, keloid scarring is common in young people between the ages of 10 and 20. Studies have shown that those with darker complexions are at a higher risk of keloid scarring as a result of skin trauma. They occur in 15–20% of individuals with sub-Saharan African, Asian or Latino ancestry, significantly less in those of a Caucasian background. Although it was previously believed that people with albinism did not get keloids, a recent report described the incidence of keloids in Africans with albinism. Keloids tend to have a genetic component, which means one is more likely to have keloids if one or both of their parents has them. However, no single gene has yet been identified which is a causing factor in keloid scarring but several susceptibility loci have been discovered, most notably in Chromosome 15.

Genetics 

People who have ancestry from Sub-Saharan Africa, Asia, or Latin America are more likely to develop a keloid.  Among ethnic Chinese in Asia, the keloid is the most common skin condition. In the United States, keloids are more common in African Americans and Hispanic Americans than European Americans. Those who have a family history of keloids are also susceptible since about 1/3 of people who get keloids have a first-degree blood relative (mother, father, sister, brother, or child) who also gets keloids. This family trait is most common in people of African and/or Asian descent.

Development of keloids among twins also lends credibility to existence of a genetic susceptibility to develop keloids. Marneros et al. (1) reported four sets of identical twins with keloids; Ramakrishnan et al. also described a pair of twins who developed keloids at the same time after vaccination. Case series have reported clinically severe forms of keloids in individuals with a positive family history and black African ethnic origin.

Pathology

Histologically, keloids are fibrotic tumors characterized by a collection of atypical fibroblasts with excessive deposition of extracellular matrix components, especially collagen, fibronectin, elastin, and proteoglycans. Generally, they contain relatively acellular centers and thick, abundant collagen bundles that form nodules in the deep dermal portion of the lesion. Keloids present a therapeutic challenge that must be addressed, as these lesions can cause significant pain,  (itching), and physical disfigurement. They may not improve in appearance over time and can limit mobility if located over a joint.

Keloids affect all sexes equally, although the incidence in young female patients has been reported to be higher than in young males, probably reflecting the greater frequency of earlobe piercing among women.
The frequency of occurrence is 15 times higher in highly pigmented people. People of African descent have increased risk of keloid occurrences.

Treatments
Prevention of keloid scars in patients with a known predisposition to them includes preventing unnecessary trauma or surgery (such as ear piercing and elective mole removal) whenever possible. Any skin problems in predisposed individuals (e.g., acne, infections) should be treated as early as possible to minimize areas of inflammation.

Treatments (both preventive and therapeutic) available are pressure therapy, silicone gel sheeting, intra-lesional triamcinolone acetonide (TAC), cryosurgery (freezing), radiation, laser therapy (PDL), IFN, 5-FU and surgical excision as well as a multitude of extracts and topical agents. Appropriate treatment of a keloid scar is age-dependent: radiotherapy, anti-metabolites and corticosteroids would not be recommended to be used in children, in order to avoid harmful side effects, like growth abnormalities.

In adults, corticosteroids combined with 5-FU and PDL in a triple therapy, enhance results and diminish side effects.

Cryotherapy (or cryosurgery) refers to the application of extreme cold to treat keloids. This treatment method is easy to perform, effective and safe and has the least chance of recurrence.

Surgical excision is currently still the most common treatment for a significant amount of keloid lesions. However, when used as the solitary form of treatment there is a large recurrence rate of between 70 and 100%. It has also been known to cause a larger lesion formation on recurrence. While not always successful alone, surgical excision when combined with other therapies dramatically decreases the recurrence rate. Examples of these therapies include but are not limited to radiation therapy, pressure therapy and laser ablation. Pressure therapy following surgical excision has shown promising results, especially in keloids of the ear and earlobe. The mechanism of how exactly pressure therapy works is unknown at present, but many patients with keloid scars and lesions have benefited from it.

Intralesional injection with a corticosteroid such as Kenalog (triamcinolone acetonide) does appear to aid in the reduction of fibroblast activity, inflammation and pruritus.

Tea tree oil, salt or other topical oil has no effect on keloid lesions.

A 2022 systematic review included multiple studies on laser therapy for treating keloid scars. There was not enough evidence for the review authors to determine if laser therapy was more effective than other treatments. They were also unable to conclude if laser therapy leads to more harm than benefits compared with no treatment or different kinds of treatment.

Another 2022 systematic review compared silicone gel sheeting with no treatment, treatment with non-silicone gel sheeting and treatment with intralesional injections of triamcinolone acetonide. The authors only found two small studies (36 participants in total) that compared these treatment options so were unable to determine which (if any) was more effective.

Epidemiology

Persons of any age can develop a keloid. Children under 10 are less likely to develop keloids, even from ear piercing. Keloids may also develop from Pseudofolliculitis barbae; continued shaving when one has razor bumps will cause irritation to the bumps, infection, and over time keloids will form. Persons with razor bumps are advised to stop shaving in order for the skin to repair itself before undertaking any form of hair removal. The tendency to form keloids is speculated to be hereditary. Keloids can tend to appear to grow over time without even piercing the skin, almost acting out a slow tumorous growth; the reason for this tendency is unknown.

Extensive burns, either thermal or radiological, can lead to unusually large keloids; these are especially common in firebombing casualties, and were a signature effect of the atomic bombings of Hiroshima and Nagasaki.

True incidence and prevalence of keloid in United States is not known. Indeed, there has never been a population study to assess the epidemiology of this disorder.  In his 2001 publication, Marneros stated that “reported incidence of keloids in the general population ranges from a high of 16% among the adults in the Democratic Republic of the Congo to a low of 0.09% in England,” quoting from Bloom's 1956 publication on heredity of keloids.  Clinical observations show that the disorder is more common among sub-Saharan Africans, African Americans and Asians, with unreliable and very wide estimated prevalence rates ranging from 4.5 to 16%.

History

Keloids were described by Egyptian surgeons around 1700 BC, recorded in the Smith papyrus, regarding surgical techniques. Baron Jean-Louis Alibert (1768–1837) identified the keloid as an entity in 1806.

The famous American Civil War-era photograph "Whipped Peter" depicts an escaped former slave with extensive keloid scarring as a result of numerous brutal beatings from his former overseer.

Intralesional corticosteroid injections was introduced as a treatment in mid-1960s as a method to attenuate scaring.

Pressure therapy has been use for prophylaxis and treatment of keloids since the 1970s.

Topical silicone gel sheeting was introduced as a treatment in the early 1980s.

References

Further reading

External links 

Dermal and subcutaneous growths
Radiation health effects
Scarring